Bunjevac-Šokac Party was a political party of Croats in the Kingdom of Serbs, Croats and Slovenes, part of province of Bačka (today Serbia).

The party was founded on September 15, 1920, in order to continue the organized political activity of Croats from Bačka (Bunjevci and Šokci), which had its tradition even before World War I. The party made good results on the parliamentary elections in 1920 and 1923. Its leader was Blaško Rajić.

After November 28, 1924, a crisis in party came because of disagreements among membership about the visions of organized political life of Croats in Bačka in future. Part of membership was for "separated" way, while the other part was politically inclining towards Croatian Republican Peasant Party (HRSS) of Stjepan Radić. At that time, the leader of Party was Josip Vuković-Đido. After disagreements with party leadership in 1924, Blaško Rajić abandoned the party.

The elections in 1925 proved that majority of Croats from Bačka stood by Bunjevac-Šokac Party. In the short time while these two parties coexisted, these parties spent that time in mutual accusations. Over the time BŠS more and more inclined towards Stjepan Radić and HSS. In 1926 almost all membership of this party joined Croatian Peasant Party (HSS) of Stjepan Radić. Finally, the Rajić himself turned to leader of Croats Stjepan Radić and became resilient supporter of him and his party, HSS.

Famous actions

On September 19, 1925, BŠS and Pučka kasina have organized in Subotica the celebration and of establishment of Kingdom of Croatia. As a part of that celebration, a memorial plaque was unveiled. The memorial plaque was set in Subotica, on the King Tomislav Square. The inscription on the plaque was "The memorial plaque of millennium of Croatian Kingdom 925-1925. Set by Bunjevci Croats" ("Spomen-ploča tisućugodišnjice hrvatskog kraljevstva 925.-1925. godine. Postaviše bunjevački Hrvati").

External links

1920 establishments in Serbia
1926 disestablishments in Yugoslavia
Agrarian parties in Serbia
Conservative parties in Serbia
Croat political parties in Serbia
Croats of Vojvodina
Defunct political parties in Serbia
Ethnic organizations based in Yugoslavia
Political parties disestablished in 1926
Political parties established in 1920
Political parties in the Kingdom of Yugoslavia